The Palisades Park Public School District is a comprehensive community public school district that serves students in pre-kindergarten through twelfth grade from Palisades Park, in Bergen County, New Jersey, United States.

As of the 2019–20 school year, the district, comprised of three schools, had an enrollment of 1,846 students and 95.7 classroom teachers (on an FTE basis), for a student–teacher ratio of 19.3:1.

The district is classified by the New Jersey Department of Education as being in District Factor Group "CD", the sixth-highest of eight groupings. District Factor Groups organize districts statewide to allow comparison by common socioeconomic characteristics of the local districts. From lowest socioeconomic status to highest, the categories are A, B, CD, DE, FG, GH, I and J.

Schools
Schools in the district (with 2019-20 enrollment data from the National Center for Education Statistics) are:
Dr. Charles R. Smith Early Childhood Center with 196 students in grades PreK-K
Jillian Romero, Principal
Lindbergh Elementary School with 858 students in grades 1-6
Patrick Phalon, Principal
Palisades Park High School with 774 students in grades 7-12
Andrew Garcia, Principal

Administration
Core members of the district's administration include:
Dr. Joseph Cirillo, Superintendent of Schools
Angela Spasevski, Business Administrator / Board Secretary

Board of education
The district's board of education, with nine members, sets policy and oversees the fiscal and educational operation of the district through its administration. As a Type II school district, the board's trustees are elected directly by voters to serve three-year terms of office on a staggered basis, with three seats up for election each year held (since 2017) as part of the November general election. The board appoints a superintendent to oversee the day-to-day operation of the district.

References

External links

Palisades Park Public School District

School Data for the Palisades Park Public School District, National Center for Education Statistics

New Jersey District Factor Group CD
Palisades Park, New Jersey
School districts in Bergen County, New Jersey